Charles F. Bassett was an American football and college basketball coach.

He served as the head men's basketball coach at Texas A&M University from 1927 to 1929 and at the University of Arkansas from 1929 to 1933. During his time at Texas A&M, he also served as a line coach for the national championship 1927 Texas A&M Aggies football team.

References

Arkansas Razorbacks men's basketball coaches
Texas A&M Aggies football coaches
Texas A&M Aggies men's basketball coaches
Year of birth missing
Year of death missing